Anders Larsson may refer to:
Anders Larsson (wrestler) (1892–1945), Swedish freestyle wrestler
Anders Larsson (canoeist) (born 1951), Swedish sprint canoer
Anders Larsson (cross-country skier) (born 1961), Swedish cross-country skier
Anders Larsson, screenwriter of Moomins and the Comet Chase
Anders Larsson, music composer of Desmond & the Swamp Barbarian Trap